The Piedmont Charcoal Kilns in Piedmont, Wyoming, are a remnant of a once-extensive charcoal-making industry in southwestern Wyoming. The kilns were built by Moses Byrne around 1869 near the Piedmont Station along the Union Pacific Railroad. A granite marker reads: 

Moses Byrne settled in Piedmont about 1867. A builder, Byrne had built a number of Pony Express stations and stables. Byrne built five kilns at Piedmont in 1869. Most of Byrne's charcoal was shipped to the area around Salt Lake City (the Utah Valley) for use in small smelters and blacksmith shops. Two kilns have since been destroyed. Piedmont itself is a ghost town.

The Piedmont Charcoal Kilns were listed on the National Register of Historic Places in 1971. They are managed by the state of Wyoming as Piedmont Charcoal Kilns State Historic Site.

References

External links

Piedmont Charcoal Kilns State Historic Site Wyoming State Parks, Historic Sites & Trails
Piedmont Charcoal Kilns Wyoming State Historic Preservation Office

History of Wyoming
Buildings and structures in Uinta County, Wyoming
Industrial buildings and structures on the National Register of Historic Places in Wyoming
Wyoming state historic sites
Pre-statehood history of Wyoming
Kilns
Charcoal
Tourist attractions in Uinta County, Wyoming
National Register of Historic Places in Uinta County, Wyoming
IUCN Category III
1869 establishments in Wyoming Territory
Buildings and structures completed in 1869